Ioannes VI (Iōannēs ST΄) may refer to:

 John VI of Constantinople (Patriarch from 712 to 715)
 John VI Kantakouzenos (c. 1292–1383)
 Pope John VI, Pope from 655 to 705

See also
John VI (disambiguation)